Stacey Livingstone (born 23 January 1988) is an Australian rules footballer playing for the Collingwood Football Club in the AFL Women's (AFLW).

Early life and state football
Livingstone was born in New South Wales but raised in Queensland.

She began playing in Victoria with Port Melbourne Colts in the VWFL as a ruck and forward, in the 2015 and 2016 seasons, scoring 24 goals in 15 matches in the 2016 season in the premier division. 

She spent time at the state academy in early 2016, playing down back and developing as a defender.

She played VFLW with the Eastern Devils in 2017 before being drafted to the AFLW.

AFL Women's career
She made her debut in round 1, 2017, in the inaugural AFLW match at IKON Park against , which she ended on the interchange bench due to a shoulder injury. She started the season weakly, with commentators saying she had to find another gear for Collingwood to rescue their season.

Collingwood re-signed Livingstone for the 2018 season during the trade period in May 2017.

In May 2018, Livingstone was re-signed by Collingwood for the 2019 season.

It was revealed Livingstone had signed on with Collingwood for the 2022 season on 10 June 2021.

Statistics
Statistics are correct to the end of the S7 (2022) season.

|- 
! scope="row" style="text-align:center" | 2017
|style="text-align:center;"|
| 12 || 7 || 0 || 0 || 43 || 7 || 50 || 16 || 8 || 0.0 || 0.0 || 6.1 || 1.0 || 7.1 || 2.3 || 1.1 || 0
|- 
! scope="row" style="text-align:center" | 2018
|style="text-align:center;"|
| 12 || 2 || 0 || 0 || 12 || 2 || 14 || 4 || 5 || 0.0 || 0.0 || 6.0 || 1.0 || 7.0 || 2.0 || 2.5 || 0
|- 
! scope="row" style="text-align:center" | 2019
|style="text-align:center;"|
| 12 || 7 || 0 || 0 || 65 || 2 || 67 || 6 || 9 || 0.0 || 0.0 || 9.3 || 0.3 || 9.6 || 0.9 || 1.3 || 0
|- 
! scope="row" style="text-align:center" | 2020
|style="text-align:center;"|
| 12 || 7 || 0 || 0 || 56 || 13 || 69 || 17 || 11 || 0.0 || 0.0 || 8.0 || 1.9 || 9.9 || 2.4 || 1.6 || 0
|- 
! scope="row" style="text-align:center" | 2021
|style="text-align:center;"|
| 12 || 11 || 0 || 0 || 121 || 20 || 141 || 38 || 14 || 0.0 || 0.0 || 11.0 || 1.8 || 12.8 || 3.5 || 1.3 || 0
|- 
! scope="row" style="text-align:center" | 2022
|style="text-align:center;"|
| 12 || 11 || 0 || 0 || 72 || 25 || 97 || 25 || 9 || 0.0 || 0.0 || 6.5 || 2.3 || 8.8 || 2.3 || 0.8 || 1
|- 
! scope="row" style="text-align:center" | S7 (2022)
|style="text-align:center;"|
| 12 || 12 || 0 || 0 || 89 || 25 || 114 || 35 || 12 || 0.0 || 0.0 || 7.4 || 2.1 || 9.5 || 2.9 || 1.0 || 
|- class="sortbottom"
! colspan=3| Career
! 57
! 0
! 0
! 458
! 94
! 552
! 141
! 68
! 0.0
! 0.0
! 8.0
! 1.6
! 9.7
! 2.5
! 1.2
! 1
|}

References

External links

 

Living people
1988 births
Collingwood Football Club (AFLW) players
Australian rules footballers from Melbourne
Sportswomen from Victoria (Australia)
Victorian Women's Football League players